The 1942 Washington Senators won 62 games, lost 89, and finished in seventh place in the American League. They were managed by Bucky Harris and played home games at Griffith Stadium.

Offseason 
 December 13, 1941: Johnny Welaj and Ken Chase were traded by the Senators to the Boston Red Sox for Stan Spence and Jack Wilson.

Regular season

Season standings

Record vs. opponents

Notable transactions 
 June 1, 1942: Mike Chartak and Steve Sundra were traded by the Senators to the St. Louis Browns for Bill Trotter and Roy Cullenbine.

Roster

Player stats

Batting

Starters by position 
Note: Pos = Position; G = Games played; AB = At bats; H = Hits; Avg. = Batting average; HR = Home runs; RBI = Runs batted in

Other batters 
Note: G = Games played; AB = At bats; H = Hits; Avg. = Batting average; HR = Home runs; RBI = Runs batted in

Pitching

Starting pitchers 
Note: G = Games pitched; IP = Innings pitched; W = Wins; L = Losses; ERA = Earned run average; SO = Strikeouts

Other pitchers 
Note: G = Games pitched; IP = Innings pitched; W = Wins; L = Losses; ERA = Earned run average; SO = Strikeouts

Relief pitchers 
Note: G = Games pitched; W = Wins; L = Losses; SV = Saves; ERA = Earned run average; SO = Strikeouts

Farm system 

Newport club folded, June 26, 1942; Florida East Coast League folded, May 14

References

External links
1942 Washington Senators at Baseball-Reference
1942 Washington Senators team page at www.baseball-almanac.com

Minnesota Twins seasons
Washington Senators season
Washington Senators